Dulce desafío (English title: Sweet challenge) is a Mexican telenovela produced by Julissa and Eugenio Cobo for Televisa in 1988.

Adela Noriega and Eduardo Yáñez starred as protagonists, while Chantal Andere, Sergio Klainer and Mercedes Olea starred as antagonists. Enrique Lizalde starred as stellar performance.

Plot 
The story starts with Lucero Sandoval, a sixteen-year-old girl who lives with her father, Santiago Sandoval and her sister, Beatriz. Lucero's mother died when she was very little and that void shows through her rebellious behaviour. Her father decides to send her to a strict boarding school for problematic girls. The director of the school, Luis Mancera abuses his authority by making life impossible for the students of the school. Lucero becomes the heroine of the boarding school where she studies.

Cast of Characters 
Main cast
Adela Noriega as Lucero Sandoval Barbosa
Eduardo Yáñez as Enrique Toledo

Supporting cast
Enrique Lizalde as Santiago Sandoval
Sergio Klainer as Luis Mancera
Mercedes Olea as Micaela Tellez
Olivia Collins as Rosario Quintana
Beatriz Aguirre as Doña Esther Sandoval
Juan Carlos Serran as Federico Higuera
Chantal Andere as Rebeca Centeno
Ginny Hoffman as Marcela Zedena
Rosa Furman as Doña Rosa
Fefi Mauri as Toña
Ana Patricia Rojo as Mirta Miranda
Alberto Estrella as Ernesto Quiroz
Armando Araiza as Francisco "Paco" Fernández
Juan Carlos Bonet as Botho Arguedas
Katia del Río as Angela Castro
Angélica Rivera as María Inés
Antonio Escobar as Sebastián
Amairani as Rocío
Celina del Villar as Carmen Ruelas
Angélica Ruvalcaba as Luisa
Paola Ochoa as Aracely Otero
Mauricio Ferrari as Álvaro Ruelas
Evangelina Martínez as Estela Sánchez
Estela Barona as Verónica
Martha Escobar as Fernanda Ojeda
Ana Urquidi as Beatriz Sandoval

Soundtrack
 Timbiriche – "Vive la Vida"
 Timbiriche – "Basta Ya"
 Timbiriche – "No Sé Si Es Amor"
 Timbiriche – "Paranoia"
 Timbiriche – "Todo Cambia"
 Timbiriche – "Tú y Yo Somos Uno Mismo"
 Timbiriche – "Ámame Hasta con los Dientes"
 Sasha Sokol – "La Leyenda"
 James Ingram – "Just Once"
 Krokus – "Our Love (Will Never Die)"
 Bonnie Tyler – "If You Were a Woman (And I Was a Man)"
 Billy Idol – "Rebel Yell"
 Gino Vannelli – "Hurts to Be in Love"

Awards

References

External links
 Dulce desafío at univision.com
 

1988 telenovelas
Mexican telenovelas
Televisa telenovelas
1988 Mexican television series debuts
1989 Mexican television series endings
Spanish-language telenovelas
Television series about teenagers
Television shows set in Mexico